Arpheuilles is a commune in the Cher department in the Centre-Val de Loire region of France.

Geography

Population

Places of interest
 The church of St.Martin, dating from the twelfth century.
 Roman remains: a road and evidence of a fort.

See also
Communes of the Cher department

References

Communes of Cher (department)